The Lakshminarasimha temple at Nuggehalli is a 13th-century Hindu temple with Hoysala architecture in Nuggehalli village, Hassan district, Karnataka, India. This three shrine Vaishnava complex is dedicated to Keshava, Lakshminarayana and Venugopala. The temple is notable for its Vaishnava reliefs, Shaiva reliefs such as those of Harihara, Dakshinamurti, Chandikesvara and Ganesha, Shakti reliefs such as of Durga Mahisasuramardini, dancing Lakshmi and Saraswati, as well as Vedic deities such as Surya and Brahma. The lower section depicts scenes from the Hindu epics and the Bhagavata Purana. The artwork completed and signed by the Hoysala artist Mallitamma are particularly notable.

Location and date
Nuggehalli, also referred to as Nuggihalli or Nuggelli, is located in Channarayapatna taluk of Hassan district in Karnataka state, India. It is located on the Tiptur-Channarayapatna state highway and is about 50 km from Hassan city (NH 75, SH 47). It is about 80 km southeast of Halebidu, and is well connected by road with Bangalore, the state capital.

The town was called Vijaya Somanathapura before the 14th-century and gained importance as an agrahara (place of learning) during the time of Bommanna Dandanayaka. The Lakshmi Narasimha temple was built in 1246 CE by Bommanna Dandanayaka, a commander in the Hoysala Empire during the rule of King Vira Someshwara. It is a good example of 13th century Hoysala architecture.  Located a short distance away in Nuggehalli, and built around the same time is the Sadashiva temple.

Architecture

This is a good example of a richly decorated Hoysala temple built in the trikuta (three towers) vimana (shrine) style with fine sculptures adorning the walls. The material used is Chloritic Schist, more commonly known as Soapstone). 

The temple is built on a jagati (platform) that closely follows the plan of the temple. On it are the three shrines located around a central closed ranga-mantapa. The ceiling of this mantapa is supported by four lathe turned pillars which is deeply domed in the center. 

The central shrine is the most prominent one and has a large tower. This shrine has a vestibule that connects the shrine to the mantapa (hall). Above the vestibule is a short extension called the sukanasi. The other two shrines have smaller towers. The main tower has lost the kalasha (decorative structure on top). Since the shrine is square in plan, the topping roof follows the same plan. There are three tiers of decorative smaller roofs that form the body of the main tower. The two lateral shrines also have five projections per side. The top of these shrines and the wall of the mantapa are crowned with a row of decorated roofs just like the main shrine. The three shrines are dedicated to Venugopala, Keshava and Lakshminarasimha, all avatars of Vishnu.

From outside, the temple actually looks like an ekakuta (single tower and shrine) temple because the two lateral shrines are simple extensions of the wall of the mantapa. This is a classic example of a trikuta (three shrines and towers) that looks like a ekakuta. A large open mantapa(hall) was added after the main temple was complete. This makes the closed mantapa look like the inner portion of the temple. The central shrine has five projections per side. 

According to art critic Gerard Foekema, the temple illustrates the Hoysala style for the wall sections. The roof meets the outer walls of the temple with two eaves all round the temple. The upper eave projects about half a meter from the wall. There is a second eave running about a meter below the upper eaves with decorative miniature towers (aedicule) between them. The wall images of Hindu gods and goddesses and their attendants are below the lower eaves, and there are 120 such sculptured panels in all. Below these are six moldings of equal size with decorations in frieze. This according to historian Kamath is the "horizontal treatment" that is a hallmark of the later Hoysala temples.< 

The six moldings at the base of the wall is divided into two sections. Starting from the base where the wall meets the jagati, the first horizontal molding contains procession of elephants, above which are a horsemen, and a band of foliage on the third. The second horizontal section starts with depictions from the Hindu epics and puranic scenes executed with detail. Above this are two friezes of yalis (or makara, an imaginary beast) and hamsas (swans). The vimana tower is divided into three horizontal sections and is even more ornate than the walls.

The images in the panels mostly depict Vaishnava legends and they are attributed to two well known Hoysala sculptors, Baichoja and Mallitamma. However, like many Hindu temples, other traditions are included. This temple has some panels with Shiva and related legends, such as in the form of Bhairava along with his consort Bhairavi. Baichoja's sculptures are on the south side of the temple. Mallitamma's sculptures are on the north side.

Gallery

See also
 Bagur, Hassan
 Sadasiva Temple

References

Bibliography
 Suryanath U. Kamath (2001). A Concise History of Karnataka from pre-historic times to the present, Jupiter books, MCC, Bangalore (Reprinted 2002).  
 Gerard Foekema, A Complete Guide to Hoysala Temples, Abhinav, 1996

External links

 Nuggehalli, A haven for architecture lovers
 Nuggehalli Sri Lakshmi Narasimha Seva Samithi
 Nuggehalli Seva Samithi, a local temple conservation initiative

Hassan district